The 1935 Home Nations Championship was the thirty-first series of the rugby union Home Nations Championship. Including the previous incarnations as the Five Nations, and prior to that, the Home Nations, this was the forty-eighth series of the northern hemisphere rugby union championship. Six matches were played between 19 January and 16 March. It was contested by England, Ireland, Scotland and Wales.

Table

Results

External links

1935
Home Nations
Home Nations
Home Nations
Home Nations
Home Nations
Home Nations Championship
Home Nations Championship
Home Nations Championship